Theiline Pigott McCone (22 Aug 1903 - 6 April 1990) was an American philanthropist.

Life
Theiline McGee was born in Milwaukee, Wisconsin. She was a daughter of Charles Augustus Anso McGee (1874-1955) and Anna Meyer (1883-1981).
Theiline married Paul Pigott (president of Pacific Car and Foundry Co) in 1924 and had 6 children by him. After his death, she married John Alexander McCone (Director of Central Intelligence) on August 29, 1962.
She died 6 April 1990 at her home in Pebble Beach, California.

Educational role

Theiline was a regent of Seattle University and a Chair at the university is named after her.

See also

 Honeymoon telegram

References

1903 births
1990 deaths
People from Milwaukee
Philanthropists from Wisconsin
20th-century American philanthropists